Widad may refer to:

Wydad Casablanca, athletics club in Casablanca, Morocco
, coastal tanker

People with the given name
Widad Akrawi (born 1969), Danish activist and writer